Miyuki Kobayashi (born 19 November 1973) is a Japanese paralympic cross-country skier and biathlete .

Career 
At the 2007 IPC World Cup, she won a gold medal in B1-B3 Biathlon Ladies.

At the  2006 Winter Paralympics , she won a gold medal in biathlon 12.5 km visually impaired, and silver medal in biathlon 7.5 km visually impaired.

References 

Living people
1973 births
Japanese female cross-country skiers
Japanese female biathletes
Paralympic biathletes of Japan
Paralympic cross-country skiers of Japan
Cross-country skiers at the 1998 Winter Paralympics
Cross-country skiers at the 2002 Winter Paralympics
Biathletes at the 1998 Winter Paralympics
Biathletes at the 2002 Winter Paralympics
Biathletes at the 2006 Winter Paralympics
Paralympic gold medalists for Japan
Paralympic silver medalists for Japan
21st-century Japanese women